The tornado outbreak of June 5–6, 2010, was a tornado outbreak that affected the Midwestern United States and Great Lakes region, starting the weekend of June 5, 2010, and extending into the morning of June 6, 2010. At least 53 tornadoes were confirmed from Iowa to southern Ontario and Ohio as well as in northern New England. Seven people were confirmed dead in Ohio just outside Toledo, and one in Dwight, Illinois. Damage from the tornadoes in the United States totaled over $266 million.

Meteorological synopsis
A low pressure system moved across the central United States on June 5 where a moderate risk was issued for areas along Interstate 80 from the Quad Cities area to near Cleveland, Ohio and Pittsburgh, Pennsylvania. Strong storms developed early in the afternoon across most of the area covered under the moderate risk and into central Iowa. Tornadoes were reported near Interstate 35 as well as in parts of central Ohio.

Severe weather shifted into Illinois during the early evening hours as the daytime heating and instability peaked. Tornadoes were reported in the Peoria, Illinois area as well as in areas just west of Chicago during the early evening hours. Heavy damage was reported in La Salle County, Illinois as well as in Livingston County, Illinois. A tornado emergency was issued in the Peoria area after multiple sightings just outside the city. Heavy damage was reported in the Elmwood and Yates City area. In Streator, an EF2 tornado damaged 180 homes, destroyed 20 homes and injured 17 people. Two other tornadoes (rated EF0 and EF3) touched down just outside Streator as well, causing additional damage to homes and power lines.  In Dwight a second EF2 tornado struck a mobile home park, destroying 12 homes and leaving several others uninhabitable. Other buildings were damaged in town and several well-built homes lost their roofs. Two separate EF0 tornadoes touched down in Dwight as well, causing damage to roofs, trees, and derailing a train. Six people were injured from the tornado, one of whom died from his injuries at the end of the month.

After midnight, storms moved into northern Indiana, northern Ohio, southern Michigan and southwestern Ontario where heavy damage was reported just outside Toledo in Wood County where seven people were killed. In Allen Township, eight homes were destroyed, three received major damage and 10 received minor damage. Heavy damage was also reported in Leamington, Ontario where a state of emergency was declared. In Michigan, shortly after midnight, Calhoun, Kalamazoo, Hillsdale, Jackson, Ingham, Branch, Berrien, Van Buren, Saint Joseph, Washtenaw, Wayne, and Monroe counties were all under simultaneous tornado warnings, including two separate simultaneous warnings covering all of Calhoun County. Damage in Calhoun County included downed trees and a metal flagpole bent at a right angle in Homer, Michigan due to extreme winds. The decision to sound tornado sirens was made in many communities. An EF1 tornado was confirmed just south of Battle Creek by the NWS; damage included a roof being torn off of a church. An EF2 tornado damaged a total of 311 houses, apartments and commercial and public buildings in Monroe County.

A moderate risk was issued for June 6 across the northeast coast of the United States primarily due to damaging wind, with tornadoes also a significant threat. However, it busted for the most part, with only scattered wind damage and no tornadoes.

Confirmed tornadoes
 Note: 5 tornadoes in Ontario are using the older Fujita scale

June 5 event

June 6 event

Aftermath
Illinois Governor Pat Quinn declared LaSalle, Livingston, Peoria and Putnam counties disaster areas. Allegations of racial discrimination in the mainly African American communities of Pembroke Township and Hopkins Park occurred after they were not included in the state disaster area. Quinn said that Kankakee County had not made a request on the behalf of Pembroke. Many residents of Pembroke received no warning before the tornadoes moved through the area. The community had received a state grant to purchase a tornado siren, but the money had never been allocated, leaving the town of 2,784 residents without any warning system. After it was revealed the area had no working siren, state lawmakers Lisa Dugan and Toi Hutchinson promised every home in the area would be supplied with a weather radio, and funding would be raised for a tornado siren. The Federal Emergency Management Agency (FEMA) rejected federal disaster aid for victims in Elmwood, Illinois.

See also
 List of North American tornadoes and tornado outbreaks

References

External links
Shattered Lives: The Blade's continuing coverage of June 5 tornadoes Published June 19, 2010 by The Blade 
Continuing coverage of the tornadoes and clean-up effort from WTOL
Photos of tornado damage from WMAQ-TV
June 5, 2010: Tornado Touchdown: Wood & Ottawa Counties (National Weather Service Cleveland forecast office)

06-05
F4 tornadoes by date
Tornadoes in Canada by date
Tornadoes in Illinois
Tornadoes in Ohio
Tornadoes in Iowa
Tornadoes in Michigan
Tornadoes in Indiana
Tornadoes in Pennsylvania
Tornadoes in New Hampshire
Tornadoes in Vermont
Tornado outbreak
Tornado outbreak